Jackson's Island can refer to:

Jackson Island in Franz Josef Land, Russia
Jackson Island (Nunavut) in Canada
Jackson's Island, a Mississippi River island near Hannibal, Missouri described in Adventures of Huckleberry Finn